Marjorie Parker Smith (March 3, 1916 – January 17, 2009) was an American figure skater who competed in ice dancing, pair skating, single skating, and fours in the latter part of the 1930s.

Nearly fifty years later, she again gained championship status in running the 300-yard and the 600-yard dashes.

Parker Smith was a member of the first official United States Ice Dancing Championship team and an inductee in the United States Figure Skating Hall of Fame, Class of 2009. She also was on the board of directors of the Society of Old Brooklynites where she was a life member. Parker Smith devoted many hours of volunteer service to NYC-based WABC Radio's 'Call For Action' program.

She died at age of 92 on January 17, 2009, at her home in Brooklyn, New York.

Parker Smith was inducted into United States Figure Skating Hall of Fame January 23, 2009, in the “Golden” category at the 2009 United States Figure Skating Championships in Cleveland.

Figure skating results

Pairs
(with Howard Meredith)

Ice dance
(with Joseph Savage)

(with George Boltres)

Fours
(with Nettie Prantel, Joseph Savage, and George Boltres)

Other medals 
 Gold: 1936 U.S. National Dance Champion
 Gold: 1939 Dance Fours (Skating Club of New York)
 Bronze: National Novice Single
 Bronze: National Senior Pair

Master track & field - World records
 1984 600 yard dash (2.23.5 minutes)
 1985 300 yard dash (71.50 seconds)

References

External links
 It All Started With a Pair of Borrowed Skates: Park Sloper Marjorie Parker Smith Was a Star on the Ice
 Five To Be Inducted into U.S. Figure Skating Hall of Fame
 U.S. Figure Skating Mourns Passing of Marjorie Parker Smith
 Parker Smith to be inducted into HOF posthumously. Bright spirit carried winner of first U.S. ice dance title.
World Figure Skating Museum and Hall of Fame
 Hall of Fame skater dies - Marjorie Parker Smith skated on Olympic world stage.
Marjorie Parker Smith's obituary
Marjorie Parker Smith's obituary

1916 births
2009 deaths
American ballroom dancers
American female ice dancers
American female pair skaters
Place of birth missing
20th-century American women
21st-century American women